Andrey Dmitriyevich Dementyev (July 16, 1928 in Tver – June 26, 2018 in Moscow) was a Soviet and Russian poet, a laureate of Lenin Komsomol Prize (1981), a USSR State Prize (1985), and Bunin Prize (2007).

Dementyev was considered one of the outstanding Russian and Soviet poets of the late 20th century. The range of his works is rich. It includes a novel about Mikhail Kalinin (August from Revel, 1970), as well as lyrics of many popular songs of the Soviet epoch (Alyonushka, Swans’ Fidelity, Father’s Home, A Ballade about the Mother, etc.) which were performed by Yevgeniy Martynov.

In October 1993, the poet's signature appeared under the Letter of Forty-Two. In September 2012, Dementyev announced that he had not signed the letter.
 
In Dementyev’s works the ideals of romanticism, humanism, and compassion are asserted. The characteristic of his poems is a sharp feeling of patriotism, rejection of the negative traits of the present, bitter irony, lyricism, optimism, enjoying simple things, loving the nature.

Andrey Dementyev died in Moscow shortly before his 90th birthday. His grandson is Russian actor Andrei Dementyev.

References

External links
 Andrey Dementyev, Peoples.ru 
 Online Encyclopedia 'Krugosvet' 
 Andrey Dementyev poetry at Stihipoeta.ru

1928 births
2018 deaths
20th-century Russian male writers
20th-century Russian poets
21st-century Russian male writers
21st-century Russian poets
People from Tver
Communist Party of the Soviet Union members
Honorary Members of the Russian Academy of Arts
Maxim Gorky Literature Institute alumni
Recipients of the Lenin Komsomol Prize
Recipients of the Order "For Merit to the Fatherland", 3rd class
Recipients of the Order "For Merit to the Fatherland", 4th class
Recipients of the Order of Honour (Russia)
Recipients of the Order of Lenin
Recipients of the Order of the Red Banner of Labour
Recipients of the USSR State Prize
Socialist realism writers
Russian lyricists
Russian magazine editors
Russian male poets
Russian male writers
Russian radio personalities
Russian television presenters
Soviet male poets
Soviet songwriters
Soviet television presenters

Burials at Kuntsevo Cemetery
Yunost editors